The Portland Trail Blazers, commonly known as the Blazers, are an American professional basketball team based in Portland, Oregon. They play in the Northwest Division of the Western Conference in the National Basketball Association (NBA). The Trail Blazers originally played their home games in the Memorial Coliseum, before moving to the Rose Garden (renamed the Moda Center in 2013) in 1995. The franchise entered the league in 1970, and Portland has been its only home city. The franchise has enjoyed a strong following; from 1977 through 1995, the team sold out 814 consecutive home games, the longest such streak in American major professional sports. The Trail Blazers are one of two teams in the major professional North American sports leagues located in the state of Oregon, with the other being the Portland Timbers. The Trail Blazers are also currently the only NBA team based in the binational Pacific Northwest, after the Vancouver Grizzlies relocated to Memphis and became the Memphis Grizzlies in 2001, and the Seattle SuperSonics relocated to Oklahoma City and became the Oklahoma City Thunder in 2008.

The team has advanced to the NBA Finals three times, winning the NBA Championship once, in 1977. The other NBA Finals appearances were in 1990 and 1992. The team has qualified for the playoffs in 35 seasons of their 49-season existence, including a streak of 21 straight appearances from 1983 through 2003, tied for the second longest streak in NBA history. Six Hall of Fame players have played for the Trail Blazers (Lenny Wilkens, Bill Walton, Clyde Drexler, Dražen Petrović, Arvydas Sabonis, and Scottie Pippen).  Bill Walton is the franchise's most decorated player; he was the NBA Finals Most Valuable Player in 1977, and the regular season MVP the following year. Four Blazer rookies (Geoff Petrie, Sidney Wicks, Brandon Roy, Damian Lillard) have won the NBA Rookie of the Year award.  Two Hall of Fame coaches, Lenny Wilkens and Jack Ramsay, have patrolled the sidelines for the Blazers, and two others, Mike Schuler and Mike Dunleavy, have won the NBA Coach of the Year award with the team.

The following is a list of players, both past and current, who appeared in at least one game for the Portland Trail Blazers NBA franchise.



Players
Note: Statistics were last updated on December 27, 2020.

A to B

|-
|align="left"| || align="center"|F/C || align="left"|Duke || align="center"|2 || align="center"|– || 114 || 1,224 || 349 || 42 || 567 || 10.7 || 3.1 || 0.4 || 5.0 || align=center|
|-
|align="left"| || align="center"|F || align="left"|California || align="center"|2 || align="center"|– || 86 || 2,595 || 536 || 158 || 1,228 || 30.2 || 6.2 || 1.8 || 14.3 || align=center|
|-
|align="left"| || align="center"|G || align="left"|Loyola Marymount || align="center"|3 || align="center"|– || 237 || 6,570 || 668 || 1,087 || 2,333 || 27.7 || 2.8 || 4.6 || 9.8 || align=center|
|-
|align="left"| || align="center"|G/F || align="left"|UCLA || align="center"|1 || align="center"| || 25 || 752 || 67 || 28 || 264 || 30.1 || 2.7 || 1.1 || 10.6 || align=center|
|-
|align="left"| || align="center"|G || align="left"|BYU || align="center"|2 || align="center"|– || 161 || 3,305 || 353 || 487 || 1,674 || 20.5 || 2.2 || 3.0 || 10.4 || align=center|
|-
|align="left" bgcolor="#FFCC00"|+ || align="center"|F/C || align="left"|Texas || align="center"|9 || align="center"|– || 648 || 22,972 || bgcolor="#CFECEC"|5,434 || 1,261 || 12,562 || 35.5 || 8.4 || 1.9 || 19.4 || align=center|
|-
|align="left"| || align="center"|F || align="left"|Kansas || align="center"|1 || align="center"| || 8 || 36 || 6 || 0 || 10 || 4.5 || 0.8 || 0.0 || 1.3 || align=center|
|-
|align="left"| || align="center"|F || align="left"|Wake Forest || align="center"|4 || align="center"|– || 293 || 8,478 || 2,085 || 425 || 2,775 || 28.9 || 7.1 || 1.5 || 9.5 || align=center|
|-
|align="left"| || align="center"|G || align="left"|USC || align="center"|2 || align="center"|– || 95 || 1,067 || 91 || 166 || 347 || 11.2 || 1.0 || 1.7 || 3.7 || align=center|
|-
|align="left"| || align="center"|G || align="left"|Kentucky || align="center"|4 || align="center"|– || 244 || 7,465 || 763 || 912 || 2,940 || 30.6 || 3.1 || 3.7 || 12.0 || align=center|
|-
|align="left"| || align="center"|G || align="left"|Georgia Tech || align="center"|2 || align="center"|– || 127 || 4,553 || 497 || 829 || 2,003 || 35.9 || 3.9 || 6.5 || 15.8 || align=center|
|-
|align="left"| || align="center"|F || align="left"|Missouri || align="center"|1 || align="center"| || 21 || 224 || 45 || 15 || 63 || 10.7 || 2.1 || 0.7 || 3.0 || align=center|
|-
|align="left"| || align="center"|F/C || align="left"|UC Santa Barbara || align="center"|2 || align="center"|– || 134 || 2,379 || 517 || 206 || 787 || 17.8 || 3.9 || 1.5 || 5.9 || align=center|
|-
|align="left" bgcolor="#CCFFCC"|x || align="center"|F || align="left"|Syracuse || align="center"|2 || align="center"|– || 60 || 1,948|| 373 || 87 || 915 || 32.5 || 6.2 || 1.5 || 15.3 || align=center|
|-
|align="left"| || align="center"|G || align="left"|UNLV || align="center"|3 || align="center"|– || 190 || 3,210 || 257 || 390 || 1,115 || 16.9 || 1.4 || 2.1 || 5.9 || align=center|
|-
|align="left"| || align="center"|F || align="left"|UCLA || align="center"|1 || align="center"| || 21 || 702 || 87 || 100 || 231 || 33.4 || 4.8 || 2.0 || 11.0 || align=center|
|-
|align="left"| || align="center"|G/F || align="left"|Memphis || align="center"|1 || align="center"| || 30 || 443 || 68 || 38 || 66 || 14.8 || 2.3 || 1.3 || 2.2 || align=center|
|-
|align="left"| || align="center"|G/F || align="left"|UNLV || align="center"|5 || align="center"|– || 284 || 4,843 || 724 || 338 || 1,314 || 17.1 || 2.5 || 1.2 || 4.6 || align=center|
|-
|align="left"| || align="center"|C || align="left"|Santa Clara || align="center"|1 || align="center"| || 10 || 121 || 14 || 8 || 15 || 12.1 || 1.4 || 0.8 || 1.5 || align=center|
|-
|align="left"| || align="center"|F || align="left"|Arizona State || align="center"|1 || align="center"| || 39 || 405 || 98 || 1 || 104 || 10.4 || 2.5 || 0.0 || 2.7 || align=center|
|-
|align="left"| || align="center"|F || align="left"|Nevada || align="center"|3 || align="center"|– || 126 || 1,404 || 262 || 51 || 482 || 11.1 || 2.1 || 0.4 || 3.8 || align=center|
|-
|align="left"| || align="center"|C || align="left"|Tuskegee || align="center"|1 || align="center"| || 1 || 7 || 0 || 0 || 2 || 7.0 || 0.0 || 0.0 || 2.0 || align=center|
|-
|align="left"| || align="center"|G || align="left"|Oklahoma State || align="center"|1 || align="center"| || 4 || 18 || 2 || 1 || 0 || 4.5 || 0.5 || 0.3 || 0.0 || align=center|
|-
|align="left"| || align="center"|G || align="left"|Vanderbilt || align="center"|2 || align="center"|– || 23 || 174 || 23 || 17 || 68 || 7.6 || 1.0 || 0.7 || 3.0 || align=center|
|-
|align="left"| || align="center"|G || align="left"|St. John's || align="center"|2 || align="center"|– || 27 || 266 || 21 || 40 || 77 || 9.9 || 0.8 || 1.5 || 2.9 || align=center|
|-
|align="left"| || align="center"|G/F || align="left"|Oregon || align="center"|1 || align="center"| || 78 || 2,371 || 376 || 323 || 1,444 || 30.4 || 4.8 || 4.1 || 18.5 || align=center|
|-
|align="left"| || align="center"|C || align="left"|Memphis || align="center"|1 || align="center"| || 2 || 37 || 14 || 3 || 7 || 18.5 || 7.0 || 1.5 || 3.5 || align=center|
|-
|align="left"| || align="center"|G || align="left"|Memphis || align="center"|3 || align="center"|– || 144 || 1,581 || 253 || 118 || 551 || 11.0 || 1.8 || 0.8 || 3.8 || align=center|
|-
|align="left"| || align="center"|G || align="left"|Kentucky State || align="center"|3 || align="center"|– || 168 || 3,024 || 294 || 338 || 2,074 || 18.0 || 1.8 || 2.0 || 12.3 || align=center|
|-
|align="left"| || align="center"|G/F || align="left"| Le Mans || align="center"|7 || align="center"|– || 481 || 14,828 || 2,432 || 1,446 || 5,390 || 30.8 || 5.1 || 3.0 || 11.2 || align=center|
|-
|align="left"| || align="center"|G || align="left"|Arizona || align="center"|2 || align="center"|– || 127 || 1,959 || 177 || 250 || 858 || 15.4 || 1.4 || 2.0 || 6.8 || align=center|
|-
|align="left"| || align="center"|G/F || align="left"|Old Dominion || align="center"|1 || align="center"| || 43 || 1111 || 172 || 61 || 340 || 25.8 || 4.0 || 1.4 || 7.9 || align=center|
|-
|align="left"| || align="center"|F || align="left"|St. John's || align="center"|1 || align="center"| || 7 || 19 || 7 || 1 || 13 || 2.7 || 1.0 || 0.1 || 1.9 || align=center|
|-
|align="left"| || align="center"|F || align="left"|North Carolina A&T || align="center"|1 || align="center"| || 11 || 51 || 18 || 1 || 14 || 4.6 || 1.6 || 0.1 || 1.3 || align=center|
|-
|align="left"| || align="center"|G || align="left"|Maryland || align="center"|5 || align="center"|– || 350 || 9,319 || 769 || 1,558 || 2,747 || 26.6 || 2.2 || 4.5 || 7.8 || align=center|
|-
|align="left" bgcolor="#CCFFCC"|x || align="center"|G || align="left"|Montana State || align="center"|1 || align="center"| || 1 || 4 || 0 || 1 || 0 || 4.0 || 0.0 || 1.0 || 0.0 || align=center|
|-
|align="left"| || align="center"|C || align="left"|Georgetown || align="center"|3 || align="center"|– || 44 || 276 || 57 || 6 || 43 || 6.3 || 1.3 || 0.1 || 1.0 || align=center|
|-
|align="left"| || align="center"|F/C || align="left"|Kentucky || align="center"|4 || align="center"|– || 139 || 3,923 || 1,122 || 359 || 1,457 || 28.2 || 8.1 || 2.6 || 10.5 || align=center|
|-
|align="left"| || align="center"|G/F || align="left"|Maryland || align="center"|1 || align="center"| || 67 || 811 || 132 || 60 || 498 || 12.1 || 2.0 || 0.9 || 7.4 || align=center|
|-
|align="left"| || align="center"|F/C || align="left"|Minnesota || align="center"|1 || align="center"| || 67 || 1,016 || 257 || 75 || 194 || 15.2 || 3.8 || 1.1 || 2.9 || align=center|
|-
|align="left"| || align="center"|G || align="left"|Arkansas || align="center"|3 || align="center"|– || 192 || 5,817 || 476 || 436 || 2,581 || 30.3 || 2.5 || 2.3 || 13.4 || align=center|
|-
|align="left"| || align="center"|G || align="left"|Murray State || align="center"|1 || align="center"| || 21 || 184 || 15 || 20 || 82 || 8.8 || 0.7 || 1.0 || 3.9 || align=center|
|-
|align="left"| || align="center"|C || align="left"|UCLA || align="center"|1 || align="center"| || 9 ||33 || 14 || 1 || 11 || 3.7 || 1.6 || 0.1 || 1.2 || align=center|
|-
|align="left"| || align="center"|G || align="left"|Temple || align="center"|2 || align="center"| || 97 || 1,142 || 124 || 214 || 287 || 11.8 || 1.3 || 2.2 || 3.0 || align=center|
|-
|align="left"| || align="center"|F/C || align="left"|Seton Hall || align="center"|7 || align="center"|– || 431 || 6,441 || 1,516 || 220 || 2,112 || 14.9 || 3.5 || 0.5 || 4.9 || align=center|
|-
|align="left"| || align="center"|G || align="left"|Evansville || align="center"|1 || align="center"| || 41 || 643 || 54 || 115 || 194 || 15.7 || 1.3 || 2.8 || 4.7 || align=center|
|-
|align="left"| || align="center"|G/F || align="left"|UCLA || align="center"|2 || align="center"| || 60 || 555 || 67 || 35 || 177 || 9.3 || 1.1 || 0.6 || 3.0 || align=center|
|}

C

|-
|align="left"| || align="center"|F || align="left"|Penn || align="center"|2 || align="center"|– || 149 || 2,113 || 359 || 122 || 652 || 14.2 || 2.4 || 0.8 || 4.4 || align=center|
|-
|align="left"| || align="center"|F/C || align="left"|UMass || align="center"|3 || align="center"|– || 122 || 3,152 || 1,215 || 231 || 591 || 25.8 || 10.0 || 1.9 || 4.8 || align=center|
|-
|align="left"| || align="center"|G || align="left"|California || align="center"|1 || align="center"| || 6 || 16 || 1 || 1 || 8 || 2.7 || 0.2 || 0.2 || 1.3 || align=center|
|-
|align="left"| || align="center"|F || align="left"|NC State || align="center"|5 || align="center"|– || 316 || 8,906 || 2,545 || 482 || 3,903 || 28.2 || 8.1 || 1.5 || 12.4 || align=center|
|-
|align="left"| || align="center"|G || align="left"|Notre Dame || align="center"|1 || align="center"| || 13 || 48 || 3 || 1 || 13 || 3.7 || 0.2 || 0.1 || 1.0 || align=center|
|-
|align="left"| || align="center"|C || align="left"|Iowa State || align="center"|2 || align="center"|– || 117 || 1,552 || 402 || 42 || 433 || 13.3 || 3.4 || 0.4 || 3.7 || align=center|
|-
|align="left"| || align="center"|G || align="left"|Wake Forest || align="center"|2 || align="center"|– || 47 || 375 || 24 || 47 || 114 || 8.0 || 0.5 || 1.0 || 2.4 || align=center|
|-
|align="left"| || align="center"|F || align="left"| Valencia || align="center"|3 || align="center"|– || 80 || 1,072 || 178 || 56 || 258 || 13.4 || 2.2 || 0.7 || 3.2 || align=center|
|-
|align="left"| || align="center"|F || align="left"|Ohio Wesleyan || align="center"|2 || align="center"|– || 126 || 1,395 || 231 || 109 || 552 || 11.1 || 1.8 || 0.9 || 4.4 || align=center|
|-
|align="left"| || align="center"|F/C || align="left"|Stanford || align="center"|1 || align="center"| || 5 || 24 || 7 || 1 || 2 || 4.8 || 1.4 || 0.2 || 0.4 || align=center|
|-
|align="left" bgcolor="#CCFFCC"|x || align="center"|F/C || align="left"|Gonzaga || align="center"|3 || align="center"|– || 154 || 2,691 || 614 || 139 || 881 || 17.5 || 4.0 || 0.9 || 5.7 || align=center|
|-
|align="left"| || align="center"|G || align="left"|New Mexico State || align="center"|2 || align="center"|– || 159 || 3,330 || 327 || 500 || 1,262 || 20.9 || 2.1 || 3.1 || 7.9 || align=center|
|-
|align="left"| || align="center"|G || align="left"|Notre Dame || align="center"|3 || align="center"|– || 155 || 1,947 || 245 || 129 || 575 || 12.6 || 1.6 || 0.8 || 3.7 || align=center|
|-
|align="left"| || align="center"|F/C || align="left"|Arizona || align="center"|1 || align="center"| || 11 || 60 || 12 || 2 || 15 || 5.5 || 1.1 || 0.2 || 1.4 || align=center|
|-
|align="left"| || align="center"|G || align="left"|St. John's || align="center"|1 || align="center"| || 17 || 139 || 6 || 24 || 14 || 8.2 || 0.4 || 1.4 || 0.8 || align=center|
|-
|align="left"| || align="center"|F/C || align="left"|New Orleans || align="center"|5 || align="center"|–– || 342 || 6,027 || 1,715 || 279 || 2,093 || 17.6 || 5.0 || 0.8 || 6.1 || align=center|
|-
|align="left" bgcolor="#CCFFCC"|x || align="center"|F || align="left"|Tennessee State || align="center"|1 || align="center"| || 2 || 60 || 12 || 3 || 10 || 30.0 || 6.0 || 1.5 || 5.0 || align=center|
|-
|align="left"| || align="center"|G/F || align="left"|California || align="center"|4 || align="center"|– || 226 || 5,142 || 524 || 238 || 1,878 || 22.8 || 2.3 || 1.1 || 8.3 || align=center|
|-
|align="left"| || align="center"|G || align="left"|Michigan || align="center"|1 || align="center"| || 60 || 1,613 || 118 || 191 || 837 || 26.9 || 2.0 || 3.2 || 14.0 || align=center|
|-
|align="left"| || align="center"|C || align="left"|North Carolina || align="center"|1 || align="center"| || 6 || 33 || 18 || 2 || 9 || 5.5 || 3.0 || 0.3 || 1.5 || align=center|
|-
|align="left"| || align="center"|G || align="left"|Virginia || align="center"|2 || align="center"|– || 29 || 398 || 33 || 68 || 108 || 13.7 || 1.1 || 2.3 || 3.7 || align=center|
|-
|align="left"| || align="center"|F || align="left"|Villanova || align="center"|2 || align="center"|– || 119 || 1,815 || 349 || 44 || 527 || 15.3 || 2.9 || 0.4 || 4.4 || align=center|
|-
|align="left"| || align="center"|G || align="left"|Duke || align="center"|1 || align="center"| || 74 || 1,399 || 120 || 66 || 581 || 18.9 || 1.6 || 0.9 || 7.9 || align=center|
|}

D to E

|-
|align="left"| || align="center"|G || align="left"|Bowling Green || align="center"|1 || align="center"| || 67 || 872 || 72 || 85 || 251 || 13.0 || 1.1 || 1.3 || 3.7 || align=center|
|-
|align="left"| || align="center"|F || align="left"|Weber State || align="center"|1 || align="center"| || 9 || 41 || 5 || 2 || 16 || 4.6 || 0.6 || 0.2 || 1.8 || align=center|
|-
|align="left"| || align="center"|G || align="left"|Wake Forest || align="center"|2 || align="center"|– || 77 || 1,423 || 122 || 186 || 643 || 18.5 || 1.6 || 2.4 || 8.4 || align=center|
|-
|align="left"| || align="center"|F/C || align="left"|Clemson || align="center"|4 || align="center"|– || 313 || 8,573 || 2,256 || 365 || 2,232 || 27.4 || 7.2 || 1.2 || 7.1 || align=center|
|-
|align="left"| || align="center"|F || align="left"|North Carolina || align="center"|3 || align="center"|– || 205 || 3,944 || 1,418 || 154 || 1,140 || 19.2 || 6.9 || 0.8 || 5.6 || align=center|
|-
|align="left"| || align="center"|G || align="left"|Dayton || align="center"|2 || align="center"|– || 161 || 3,639 || 299 || 365 || 1,508 || 22.6 || 1.9 || 2.3 || 9.4 || align=center|
|-
|align="left"| || align="center"|G/F || align="left"|North Carolina || align="center"|1 || align="center"| || 32 || 439 || 58 || 41 || 196 || 13.7 || 1.8 || 1.3 || 6.1 || align=center|
|-
|align="left"| || align="center"|G || align="left"|Gonzaga || align="center"|2 || align="center"| || 70 || 595 || 53 || 90 || 212 || 8.5 || 0.8 || 1.3 || 3.0 || align=center|
|-
|align="left"| || align="center"|F || align="left"|Idaho || align="center"|1 || align="center"| || 3 || 12 || 2 || 0 || 7 || 4.0 || 0.7 || 0.0 || 2.3 || align=center|
|-
|align="left"| || align="center"|G || align="left"|Marquette || align="center"|1 || align="center"| || 5 || 26 || 1 || 4 || 3 || 5.2 || 0.2 || 0.8 || 0.6 || align=center|
|-
|align="left"| || align="center"|F || align="left"|Arizona State || align="center"|1 || align="center"| || 19 || 73 || 17 || 0 || 27 || 3.8 || 0.9 || 0.0 || 1.4 || align=center|
|-
|align="left"| || align="center"|G/F || align="left"|Purdue || align="center"|1 || align="center"| || 63 || 970 || 190 || 103 || 386 || 15.4 || 3.0 || 1.6 || 6.1 || align=center|
|-
|align="left"| || align="center"|G || align="left"|Maryland || align="center"|2 || align="center"|– || 131 || 3,163 || 262 || 231 || 1,425 || 24.1 || 2.0 || 1.8 || 10.9 || align=center|
|-
|align="left"| || align="center"|G || align="left"| Partizan || align="center"|1 || align="center"| || 8 || 61 || 5 || 5 || 25 || 7.6 || 0.6 || 0.6 || 3.1 || align=center|
|-
|align="left"| || align="center"|F || align="left"|Georgia || align="center"|1 || align="center"| || 4 || 51 || 10 || 3 || 25 || 12.8 || 2.5 || 0.8 || 6.3 || align=center|
|-
|align="left" bgcolor="#FFFF99"|^ (#22) || align="center"|G || align="left"|Houston || align="center" bgcolor="#CFECEC"|12 || align="center"|– || bgcolor="#CFECEC"|867 || bgcolor="#CFECEC"|29,496 || 5,339 || 4,933 || bgcolor="#CFECEC"|18,040 || 34.0 || 6.2 || 5.7 || 20.8 || align=center|
|-
|align="left" bgcolor="#FFCC00"|+ || align="center"|C || align="left"|Eastern Illinois || align="center"|7 || align="center"|– || 527 || 14,595 || 3,327 || 498 || 7,188 || 27.7 || 6.3 || 0.9 || 13.6 || align=center|
|-
|align="left"| || align="center"|C || align="left"|Yale || align="center"|6 || align="center"|–– || 295 || 6,433 || 2,183 || 130 || 1,230 || 21.8 || 7.4 || 0.4 || 4.2 || align=center|
|-
|align="left"| || align="center"|G/F || align="left"|Alabama || align="center"|3 || align="center"|– || 225 || 4,437 || 815 || 295 || 1,415 || 19.7 || 3.6 || 1.3 || 6.3 || align=center|
|-
|align="left"| || align="center"|F/C || align="left"|Washington || align="center"|1 || align="center"| || 28 || 266 || 43 || 8 || 75 || 9.5 || 1.5 || 0.3 || 2.7 || align=center|
|-
|align="left"| || align="center"|G/F || align="left"|American International || align="center"|1 || align="center"| || 82 || 1,757 || 216 || 177 || 708 || 21.4 || 2.6 || 2.2 || 8.6 || align=center|
|-
|align="left" bgcolor="#CCFFCC"|x || align="center"|G || align="left"|Washington State || align="center"|1 || align="center"| || 1 || 4 || 2 || 1 || 2 || 4.0 || 2.0 || 1.0 || 2.0 || align=center|
|-
|align="left"| || align="center"|F/C || align="left"|St. John's || align="center"|1 || align="center"| || 74 || 2,581 || 907 || 235 || 1,179 || 34.9 || 12.3 || 3.2 || 15.9 || align=center|
|-
|align="left"| || align="center"|C || align="left"|Wyoming || align="center"|1 || align="center"| || 7 || 17 || 8 || 1 || 11 || 2.4 || 1.1 || 0.1 || 1.6 || align=center|
|-
|align="left"| || align="center"|F || align="left"|Rhode Island || align="center"|1 || align="center"| || 18 || 70 || 20 || 6 || 27 || 3.9 || 1.1 || 0.3 || 1.5 || align=center|
|}

F to G

|-
|align="left"| || align="center"|G || align="left"|North Carolina || align="center"|1 || align="center"| || 60 || 1,906 || 149 || 390 || 684 || 31.8 || 2.5 || 6.5 || 11.4 || align=center|
|-
|align="left"| || align="center"|G/F || align="left"|Detroit Mercy || align="center"|1 || align="center"| || 7 || 32 || 4 || 1 || 13 || 4.6 || 0.6 || 0.1 || 1.9 || align=center|
|-
|align="left"| || align="center"|G || align="left"| Joventut Badalona || align="center"|3 || align="center"|– || 218 || 5,255 || 543 || 479 || 1,986 || 24.1 || 2.5 || 2.2 || 9.1 || align=center|
|-
|align="left"| || align="center"|C || align="left"|Houston || align="center"|1 || align="center"| || 12 || 34 || 13 || 1 || 9 || 2.8 || 1.1 || 0.1 || 0.8 || align=center|
|-
|align="left"| || align="center"|G || align="left"|Syracuse || align="center"|1 || align="center"| || 18 || 281 || 31 || 68 || 94 || 15.6 || 1.7 || 3.8 || 5.2 || align=center|
|-
|align="left"| || align="center"|G || align="left"|Gonzaga || align="center"|1 || align="center"| || 43 || 499 || 61 || 30 || 164 || 11.6 || 1.4 || 0.7 || 3.8 || align=center|
|-
|align="left"| || align="center"|G || align="left"|Penn State || align="center"|2 || align="center"|– || 40 || 340 || 48 || 59 || 74 || 8.5 || 1.2 || 1.5 || 1.9 || align=center|
|-
|align="left"| || align="center"|F/C || align="left"| Gran Canaria || align="center"|3 || align="center"|– || 151 || 1,821 || 518 || 65 || 477 || 12.1 || 3.4 || 0.4 || 3.2 || align=center|
|-
|align="left"| || align="center"|F/C || align="left"|Arizona || align="center"|2 || align="center"|– || 141 || 2,088 || 494 || 81 || 793 || 14.8 || 3.5 || 0.6 || 5.6 || align=center|
|-
|align="left"| || align="center"|G || align="left"|BYU || align="center"|1 || align="center"| || 80 || 1,674 || 159 || 279 || 559 || 20.9 || 2.0 || 3.5 || 7.0 || align=center|
|-
|align="left"| || align="center"|F || align="left"|Kentucky || align="center"|1 || align="center"| || 19 || 174 || 42 || 5 || 44 || 9.2 || 2.2 || 0.3 || 2.3 || align=center|
|-
|align="left"| || align="center"|G || align="left"|Elizabeth City State || align="center"|1 || align="center"| || 42 || 476 || 47 || 70 || 179 || 11.3 || 1.1 || 1.7 || 4.3 || align=center|
|-
|align="left"| || align="center"|G/F || align="left"|Iowa || align="center"|1 || align="center"| || 9 || 19 || 3 || 1 || 0 || 2.1 || 0.3 || 0.1 || 0.0 || align=center|
|-
|align="left"| || align="center"|G || align="left"|Alabama || align="center"|1 || align="center"| || 15 || 151 || 24 || 6 || 51 || 10.1 || 1.6 || 0.4 || 3.4 || align=center|
|-
|align="left" bgcolor="#CCFFCC"|x || align="center"|F/C || align="left"|Duke || align="center"|1 || align="center"| || 1 || 4 || 2 || 0 || 3 || 4.0 || 2.0 || 0.0 || 3.0 || align=center|
|-
|align="left"| || align="center"|G || align="left"|Weber State || align="center"|1 || align="center"| || 22 || 157 || 17 || 16 || 50 || 7.1 || 0.8 || 0.7 || 2.3 || align=center|
|-
|align="left"| || align="center"|G/F || align="left"|Purdue || align="center"|1 || align="center"| || 80 || 1,665 || 201 || 170 || 744 || 20.8 || 2.5 || 2.1 || 9.3 || align=center|
|-
|align="left"| || align="center"|F || align="left"|Fort Valley State || align="center"|1 || align="center"| || 27 || 261 || 73 || 12 || 58 || 9.7 || 2.7 || 0.4 || 2.1 || align=center|
|-
|align="left"| || align="center"|G || align="left"|Oklahoma State || align="center"|1 || align="center"| || 14 || 165 || 21 || 5 || 45 || 11.8 || 1.5 || 0.4 || 3.2 || align=center|
|-
|align="left"| || align="center"|F || align="left"|Xavier || align="center"|3 || align="center"|– || 172 || 4,768 || 1,369 || 217 || 1,746 || 27.7 || 8.0 || 1.3 || 10.2 || align=center|
|-
|align="left"| || align="center"|G || align="left"|Michigan || align="center"|4 || align="center"|– || 31 || 407 || 51 || 89 || 127 || 13.1 || 1.6 || 2.9 || 4.1 || align=center|
|-
|align="left"| || align="center"|F || align="left"|Oklahoma || align="center"|3 || align="center"|– || 228 || 6,277 || 996 || 300 || 2,190 || 27.5 || 4.4 || 1.3 || 9.6 || align=center|
|-
|align="left"| || align="center"|G || align="left"|Florida || align="center"|1 || align="center"| || 8 || 44 || 4 || 8 || 17 || 5.5 || 0.5 || 1.0 || 2.1 || align=center|
|-
|align="left"| || align="center"|F/C || align="left"|South Carolina || align="center"|2 || align="center"|– || 126 || 3,524 || 925 || 268 || 1,333 || 28.0 || 7.3 || 2.1 || 10.6 || align=center|
|-
|align="left"| (#30) || align="center"|G/F || align="left"|Long Beach State || align="center"|7 || align="center"|– || 486 || 12,202 || 2,187 || 1,447 || 4,484 || 25.1 || 4.5 || 3.0 || 9.2 || align=center|
|-
|align="left"| || align="center"|C || align="left"|Washington || align="center"|1 || align="center"| || 68 || 845 || 186 || 59 || 219 || 12.4 || 2.7 || 0.9 || 3.2 || align=center|
|}

H to J

|-
|align="left"|Ha Seung-jin || align="center"|C || align="left"| Yonsei University || align="center"|2 || align="center"|– || 46 || 316 || 67 || 3 || 70 || 6.9 || 1.5 || 0.1 || 1.5 || align=center|
|-
|align="left"| || align="center"|G/F || align="left"|Utah State || align="center"|1 || align="center"| || 79 || 1,629 || 415 || 211 || 707 || 20.6 || 5.3 || 2.7 || 8.9 || align=center|
|-
|align="left"| || align="center"|G || align="left"|UCLA || align="center"|1 || align="center"| || 1 || 5 || 3 || 0 || 3 || 5.0 || 3.0 || 0.0 || 3.0 || align=center|
|-
|align="left"| || align="center"|G/F || align="left"|St. John's || align="center"|4 || align="center"|– || 274 || 6,359 || 1,052 || 282 || 2,116 || 23.2 || 3.8 || 1.0 || 7.7 || align=center|
|-
|align="left"| || align="center"|F/C || align="left"|North Park || align="center"|2 || align="center"|– || 123 || 1,894 || 432 || 71 || 613 || 15.4 || 3.5 || 0.6 || 5.0 || align=center|
|-
|align="left"| || align="center"|F/C || align="left"|Pfeiffer || align="center"|2 || align="center"|– || 31 || 209 || 47 || 9 || 72 || 6.7 || 1.5 || 0.3 || 2.3 || align=center|
|-
|align="left"| || align="center"|F/C || align="left"|Washington || align="center"|1 || align="center"| || 66 || 1,360 || 479 || 105 || 475 || 20.6 || 7.3 || 1.6 || 7.2 || align=center|
|-
|align="left"| || align="center"|G || align="left"|Duke || align="center"|1 || align="center"| || 72 || 1,431 || 211 || 75 || 624 || 19.9 || 2.9 || 1.0 || 8.7 || align=center|
|-
|align="left"| || align="center"|G || align="left"|Kansas State || align="center"|1 || align="center"| || 37 || 380 || 26 || 85 || 119 || 10.3 || 0.7 || 2.3 || 3.2 || align=center|
|-
|align="left"| || align="center"|F || align="left"|Croatia || align="center"|1 || align="center"| || 53 || 871 || 184 || 50 || 256 || 16.4 || 2.9 || 0.9 || 4.8 || align=center|
|-
|align="left"| || align="center"|F/C || align="left"|NC State || align="center"|2 || align="center"|– || 99 || 2,923 || 986 || 111 || 1,305 || 29.5 || 10.0 || 1.1 || 13.2 || align=center|
|-
|align="left"| || align="center"|G/F || align="left"|Michigan || align="center"|1 || align="center"| || 2 || 12 || 0 || 0 || 0 || 6.0 || 0.0 || 0.0 || 0.0 || align=center|
|-
|align="left"| || align="center"|F || align="left"|Wake Forest || align="center"|1 || align="center"| || 13 || 103 || 32 || 4 || 38 || 7.9 || 2.5 || 0.3 || 2.9 || align=center|
|-
|align="left" bgcolor="#FFCC00"|+ (#14) || align="center"|G || align="left"|Arizona State || align="center"|5 || align="center"|– || 315 || 9,236 || 831 || 1,374 || 4,379 || 29.3 || 2.6 || 4.4 || 13.9 || align=center|
|-
|align="left"| || align="center"|G || align="left"|UCLA || align="center"|2 || align="center"|– || 140 || 1,758 || 187 || 284 || 627 || 12.6 || 1.3 || 2.0 || 4.5 || align=center|
|-
|align="left" bgcolor="#CCFFCC"|x || align="center"|G/F || align="left"|Duke || align="center"|3 || align="center"|– || 50 || 1308 || 120 || 69 || 491 || 26.2 || 2.4 || 1.4 || 9.8 || align=center|
|-
|align="left"| || align="center"|F || align="left"|Michigan || align="center"|1 || align="center"| || 73 || 1,632 || 335 || 61 || 437 || 22.4 || 4.6 || 0.8 || 6.0 || align=center|
|-
|align="left"| || align="center"|C || align="left"|California || align="center"|1 || align="center"| || 40 || 404 || 107 || 50 || 105 || 10.1 || 2.7 || 1.3 || 2.6 || align=center|
|-
|align="left"| || align="center"|G || align="left"|Missouri || align="center"|1 || align="center"| || 50 || 488 || 74 || 47 || 258 || 9.8 || 1.5 || 0.9 || 5.2 || align=center|
|-
|align="left"| || align="center"|G || align="left"|Georgia Tech || align="center"|3 || align="center"|– || 240 || 6,479 || 602 || 949 || 2,286 || 27.0 || 2.5 || 4.0 || 9.5 || align=center|
|-
|align="left"| || align="center"|G/F || align="left"|Georgetown || align="center"|1 || align="center"| || 29 || 187 || 17 || 27 || 80 || 6.4 || 0.6 || 0.9 || 2.8 || align=center|
|-
|align="left"| || align="center"|G || align="left"|Ohio State || align="center"|1 || align="center"| || 49 || 1,175 || 159 || 128 || 414 || 24.0 || 3.2 || 2.6 || 8.4 || align=center|
|-
|align="left"| || align="center"|F/C || align="left"|Wisconsin-Parkside || align="center"|1 || align="center"| || 77 || 1,286 || 270 || 95 || 737 || 16.7 || 3.5 || 1.2 || 9.6 || align=center|
|-
|align="left"| || align="center"|F || align="left"|Indiana || align="center"|1 || align="center"| || 38 || 350 || 60 || 14 || 44 || 9.2 || 1.6 || 0.4 || 1.2 || align=center|
|-
|align="left"| || align="center"|G || align="left"|Nevada || align="center"|2 || align="center"|– || 39 || 282 || 37 || 45 || 112 || 7.2 || 0.9 || 1.2 || 2.9 || align=center|
|-
|align="left"| || align="center"|C || align="left"|LSU || align="center"|2 || align="center"|– || 30 || 199 || 45 || 3 || 59 || 6.6 || 1.5 || 0.1 || 2.0 || align=center|
|-
|align="left"| || align="center"|F/C || align="left"|Florida A&M || align="center"|1 || align="center"| || 74 || 794 || 226 || 78 || 240 || 10.7 || 3.1 || 1.1 || 3.2 || align=center|
|-
|align="left"| || align="center"|G/F || align="left"|Syracuse || align="center"|1 || align="center"| || 42 || 356 || 48 || 13 || 157 || 8.5 || 1.1 || 0.3 || 3.7 || align=center|
|-
|align="left"| || align="center"|F || align="left"|Iowa || align="center"|3 || align="center"|– || 158 || 5,039 || 1,056 || 544 || 2,525 || 31.9 || 6.7 || 3.4 || 16.0 || align=center|
|-
|align="left"| || align="center"|F || align="left"|Michigan State || align="center"|1 || align="center"| || 64 || 815 || 243 || 19 || 263 || 12.7 || 3.8 || 0.3 || 4.1 || align=center|
|-
|align="left"| || align="center"|F || align="left"|Temple || align="center"|2 || align="center"|– || 157 || 3,856 || 741 || 367 || 1,267 || 24.6 || 4.7 || 2.3 || 8.1 || align=center|
|-
|align="left"| || align="center"|F/C || align="left"|Oregon State || align="center"|3 || align="center"|– || 194 || 4,872 || 1,166 || 317 || 2,713 || 25.1 || 6.0 || 1.6 || 14.0 || align=center|
|-
|align="left"| || align="center"|F || align="left"|Tampa || align="center"|1 || align="center"| || 15 || 74 || 21 || 1 || 35 || 4.9 || 1.4 || 0.1 || 2.3 || align=center|
|-
|align="left"| || align="center"|F/C || align="left"|Albany State || align="center"|4 || align="center"|– || 309 || 6,072 || 1,518 || 278 || 1,231 || 19.7 || 4.9 || 0.9 || 4.0 || align=center|
|-
|align="left"| || align="center"|F || align="left"|Louisville || align="center"|1 || align="center"| || 37 || 186 || 31 || 8 || 51 || 5.0 || 0.8 || 0.2 || 1.4 || align=center|
|-
|align="left" bgcolor="#CCFFCC"|x || align="center"|F || align="left"|UNLV || align="center"|1 || align="center"| || 2 || 62 || 10 || 1 || 15 || 31.0 || 5.0 || 0.5 || 7.5 || align=center|
|-
|align="left"| || align="center"|G/F || align="left"|Oregon || align="center"|1 || align="center"| || 24 || 449 || 33 || 53 || 115 || 18.7 || 1.4 || 2.2 || 4.8 || align=center|
|-
|align="left"| || align="center"|G/F || align="left"|Miami (FL) || align="center"|1 || align="center"| || 58 || 1,276 || 161 || 34 || 463 || 22.0 || 2.8 || 0.6 || 8.0 || align=center|
|-
|align="left"| || align="center"|F/C || align="left"|Saint Louis || align="center"|1 || align="center"| || 63 || 1,065 || 296 || 80 || 344 || 16.9 || 4.7 || 1.3 || 5.5 || align=center|
|-
|align="left"| || align="center"|G/F || align="left"|Oregon || align="center"|1 || align="center"| || 64 || 819 || 75 || 63 || 414 || 12.8 || 1.2 || 1.0 || 6.5 || align=center|
|-
|align="left"| || align="center"|G || align="left"|Rutgers || align="center"|1 || align="center"| || 13 || 183 || 13 || 39 || 33 || 14.1 || 1.0 || 3.0 || 2.5 || align=center|
|-
|align="left"| || align="center"|G || align="left"|New Mexico State || align="center"|1 || align="center"| || 9 || 99 || 23 || 11 || 20 || 11.0 || 2.6 || 1.2 || 2.2 || align=center|
|-
|align="left"| || align="center"|G/F || align="left"|Utah || align="center"|1 || align="center"| || 34 || 309 || 43 || 17 || 105 || 9.1 || 1.3 || 0.5 || 3.1 || align=center|
|}

K to L

|-
|align="left"| || align="center"|C || align="left"|Central Michigan || align="center"|2 || align="center"|– || 90 || 1,510 || 508 || 76 || 682 || 16.8 || 5.6 || 0.8 || 7.6 || align=center|
|-
|align="left" bgcolor="#CCFFCC"|x || align="center"|C || align="left"| Fenerbahçe || align="center"|2 || align="center"| || 25 || 556 || 215 || 32 || 325 || 22.2 || 8.6 || 1.3 || 13.0 || align=center|
|-
|align="left"| || align="center"|F/C || align="left"|Concord HS (IN) || align="center"|2 || align="center"|– || 143 || 2,315 || 547 || 117 || 895 || 16.2 || 3.8 || 0.8 || 6.3 || align=center|
|-
|align="left"| || align="center"|G || align="left"|Arizona || align="center"|1 || align="center"| || 65 || 775 || 60 || 63 || 269 || 11.9 || 0.9 || 1.0 || 4.1 || align=center|
|-
|align="left"| || align="center"|F || align="left"|Longwood || align="center"|11 || align="center"|– || 831 || 21,760 || 5,078 || 1,762 || 10,067 || 26.2 || 6.1 || 2.1 || 12.1 || align=center|
|-
|align="left"| || align="center"|F || align="left"| CSKA Moscow || align="center"|2 || align="center"|– || 101 || 2,015 || 415 || 113 || 538 || 20.0 || 4.1 || 1.1 || 5.3 || align=center|
|-
|align="left"| || align="center"|C || align="left"|Arkansas || align="center"|1 || align="center"| || 7 || 31 || 6 || 2 || 11 || 4.4 || 0.9 || 0.3 || 1.6 || align=center|
|-
|align="left"| || align="center"|G || align="left"|Dayton || align="center"|1 || align="center"| || 3 || 43 || 3 || 11 || 18 || 14.3 || 1.0 || 3.7 || 6.0 || align=center|
|-
|align="left"| || align="center"|F || align="left"|Cal State Los Angeles || align="center"|2 || align="center"|– || 101 || 1,145 || 283 || 83 || 472 || 11.3 || 2.8 || 0.8 || 4.7 || align=center|
|-
|align="left"| || align="center"|F/C || align="left"|Iowa || align="center"|3 || align="center"|– || 94 || 1,381 || 465 || 114 || 419 || 14.7 || 4.9 || 1.2 || 4.5 || align=center|
|-
|align="left"| || align="center"|F || align="left"|Kentucky || align="center"|2 || align="center"|– || 42 || 630 || 188 || 47 || 221 || 15.0 || 4.5 || 1.1 || 5.3 || align=center|
|-
|align="left"| || align="center"|F/C || align="left"|Kansas || align="center"|2 || align="center"|– || 66 || 643 || 137 || 14 || 165 || 9.7 || 2.1 || 0.2 || 2.5 || align=center|
|-
|align="left"| || align="center"|G/F || align="left"|Virginia || align="center"|3 || align="center"|– || 177 || 1,967 || 203 || 137 || 825 || 11.1 || 1.1 || 0.8 || 4.7 || align=center|
|-
|align="left"| || align="center"|F || align="left"|Maryland || align="center"|3 || align="center"|– || 141 || 1,736 || 257 || 75 || 653 || 12.3 || 1.8 || 0.5 || 4.6 || align=center|
|-
|align="left"| || align="center"|G || align="left"|USC || align="center"|1 || align="center"| || 22 || 327 || 33 || 51 || 124 || 14.9 || 1.5 || 2.3 || 5.6 || align=center|
|-
|align="left"| || align="center"|G || align="left"|UCLA || align="center"|1 || align="center"| || 5 || 35 || 2 || 11 || 6 || 7.0 || 0.4 || 2.2 || 1.2 || align=center|
|-
|align="left"| || align="center"|G || align="left"|Minnesota || align="center"|1 || align="center"| || 14 || 220 || 19 || 23 || 92 || 15.7 || 1.4 || 1.6 || 6.6 || align=center|
|-
|align="left"| || align="center"|F/C || align="left"|Illinois || align="center"|7 || align="center"|– || 393 || 6,095 || 1,470 || 338 || 2,183 || 15.5 || 3.7 || 0.9 || 5.6 || align=center|
|-
|align="left"| || align="center"|G || align="left"|Arizona State || align="center"|2 || align="center"|– || 162 || 4,030 || 443 || 798 || 1,421 || 24.9 || 2.7 || 4.9 || 8.8 || align=center|
|-
|align="left" bgcolor="#FBCEB1"|* || align="center"|G || align="left"|Weber State || align="center"|9 || align="center"|– || 617 || 22,456 || 2,582 || 4,025 || 14,928 || 36.4 || 4.2 || 6.5 || bgcolor="#CFECEC"|24.2 || align=center|
|-
|align="left"| || align="center"|F/C || align="left"|Arizona State || align="center"|1 || align="center"| || 7 || 44 || 11 || 1 || 6 || 6.3 || 1.6 || 0.1 || 0.9 || align=center|
|-
|align="left" bgcolor="#CCFFCC"|x || align="center"|F || align="left"|North Carolina || align="center"|1 || align="center"| || 48 || 573 || 108 || 22 || 172 || 11.9 || 2.3 || 0.5 || 3.6 || align=center|
|-
|align="left"| || align="center"|C || align="left"|Stanford || align="center"|2 || align="center"|– || 141 || 4,241 || 1,094 || 128 || 1,474 || 30.1 || 7.8 || 0.9 || 10.5 || align=center|
|-
|align="left" bgcolor="#FFCC00"|+ (#20) || align="center"|F/C || align="left"|Marquette || align="center"|5 || align="center"|– || 330 || 9,811 || 2,876 || 836 || 5,151 || 29.7 || 8.7 || 2.5 || 15.6 || align=center|
|-
|align="left"| || align="center"|G || align="left"|Miami (OH) || align="center"|1 || align="center"| || 48 || 792 || 59 || 177 || 202 || 16.5 || 1.2 || 3.7 || 4.2 || align=center|
|}

M

|-
|align="left"| || align="center"|C || align="left"|Kentucky || align="center"|1 || align="center"| || 81 || 1,703 || 492 || 30 || 529 || 21.0 || 6.1 || 0.4 || 6.5 || align=center|
|-
|align="left"| || align="center"|F || align="left"|Jackson State || align="center"|1 || align="center"| || 79 || 1,558 || 411 || 111 || 561 || 19.7 || 5.2 || 1.4 || 7.1 || align=center|
|-
|align="left"| || align="center"|F/C || align="left"|California || align="center"|1 || align="center"| || 29 || 208 || 40 || 4 || 45 || 7.2 || 1.4 || 0.1 || 1.6 || align=center|
|-
|align="left"| || align="center"|F || align="left"|USC || align="center"|1 || align="center"| || 39 || 375 || 84 || 30 || 119 || 9.6 || 2.2 || 0.8 || 3.1 || align=center|
|-
|align="left"| || align="center"|F || align="left"|Kansas || align="center"|1 || align="center"| || 5 || 14 || 0 || 0 || 4 || 2.8 || 0.0 || 0.0 || 0.8 || align=center|
|-
|align="left"| || align="center"|C || align="left"|Loyola (IL) || align="center"|4 || align="center"|– || 271 || 3,795 || 1,258 || 203 || 1,430 || 14.0 || 4.6 || 0.7 || 5.3 || align=center|
|-
|align="left"| || align="center"|C || align="left"| Real Madrid Baloncesto || align="center"|1 || align="center"| || 24 || 146 || 28 || 9 || 22 || 6.1 || 1.2 || 0.4 || 0.9 || align=center|
|-
|align="left"| || align="center"|G || align="left"|Marquette || align="center"|5 || align="center"|– || 359 || 12,193 || 1,184 || 787 || 5,525 || 34.0 || 3.3 || 2.2 || 15.4 || align=center|
|-
|align="left"| || align="center"|F || align="left"|Furman || align="center"|1 || align="center"| || 5 || 24 || 6 || 0 || 4 || 4.8 || 1.2 || 0.0 || 0.8 || align=center|
|-
|align="left"| || align="center"|G || align="left"|VCU || align="center"|1 || align="center"| || 27 || 572 || 28 || 109 || 187 || 21.2 || 1.0 || 4.0 || 6.9 || align=center|
|-
|align="left"| || align="center"|G || align="left"|Drake || align="center"|1 || align="center"| || 39 || 612 || 43 || 85 || 243 || 15.7 || 1.1 || 2.2 || 6.2 || align=center|
|-
|align="left" bgcolor="#CCFFCC"|x || align="center"|G || align="left"|Lehigh || align="center"|8 || align="center"|– || 483 || 14,957 || 1,594 || 1,517 || 8,951 || 31.0 || 3.3 || 3.1 || 18.5 || align=center|
|-
|align="left"| || align="center"|F/C || align="left"|Memphis || align="center"|1 || align="center"| || 42 || 375 || 89 || 20 || 123 || 8.9 || 2.1 || 0.5 || 2.9 || align=center|
|-
|align="left"| || align="center"|G || align="left"|North Carolina || align="center"|2 || align="center"|– || 114 || 2,580 || 191 || 366 || 897 || 22.6 || 1.7 || 3.2 || 7.9 || align=center|
|-
|align="left"| || align="center"|G/F || align="left"|NYU || align="center"|3 || align="center"|– || 171 || 4,433 || 602 || 391 || 2,302 || 25.9 || 3.5 || 2.3 || 13.5 || align=center|
|-
|align="left"| || align="center"|G || align="left"|Temple || align="center"|3 || align="center"|– || 167 || 3,861 || 526 || 378 || 1,327 || 23.1 || 3.1 || 2.3 || 7.9 || align=center|
|-
|align="left"| || align="center"|F || align="left"|Columbia || align="center"|1 || align="center"| || 23 || 278 || 39 || 33 || 83 || 12.1 || 1.7 || 1.4 || 3.6 || align=center|
|-
|align="left"| || align="center"|F || align="left"|Duke || align="center"|1 || align="center"| || 8 || 28 || 10 || 2 || 12 || 3.5 || 1.3 || 0.3 || 1.5 || align=center|
|-
|align="left"| || align="center"|F || align="left"|East St. Louis HS (IL) || align="center"|3 || align="center"|– || 145 || 4,176 || 673 || 284 || 1,899 || 28.8 || 4.6 || 2.0 || 13.1 || align=center|
|-
|align="left"| || align="center"|G || align="left"|Utah || align="center"|2 || align="center"|– || 163 || 5,150 || 568 || 1,011 || 2,175 || 31.6 || 3.5 || 6.2 || 13.3 || align=center|
|-
|align="left"| || align="center"|G || align="left"|Saint Mary's || align="center"|2 || align="center"|– || 74 || 821 || 53 || 114 || 379 || 11.1 || 0.7 || 1.5 || 5.1 || align=center|
|-
|align="left"| || align="center"|F || align="left"| CSKA Moscow || align="center"|1 || align="center"| || 23 || 336 || 51 || 19 || 75 || 14.6 || 2.2 || 0.8 || 3.3 || align=center|
|-
|align="left"| || align="center"|G || align="left"|Westchester CC || align="center"|1 || align="center"| || 12 || 42 || 4 || 1 || 14 || 3.5 || 0.3 || 0.1 || 1.2 || align=center|
|-
|align="left"| || align="center"|F || align="left"|Jacksonville || align="center"|1 || align="center"| || 18 || 89 || 11 || 6 || 36 || 4.9 || 0.6 || 0.3 || 2.0 || align=center|
|-
|align="left"| || align="center"|F || align="left"|UCLA || align="center"|4 || align="center"|– || 150 || 1,663 || 236 || 57 || 884 || 11.1 || 1.6 || 0.4 || 5.9 || align=center|
|-
|align="left"| || align="center"|F/C || align="left"|Detroit Mercy || align="center"|1 || align="center"| || 2 || 20 || 7 || 1 || 11 || 10.0 || 3.5 || 0.5 || 5.5 || align=center|
|}

N to P

|-
|align="left"| || align="center"|G || align="left"|UConn || align="center"|2 || align="center"|– || 127 || 2,047 || 231 || 217 || 862 || 16.1 || 1.8 || 1.7 || 6.8 || align=center|
|-
|align="left"| || align="center"|F || align="left"|Louisiana–Monroe || align="center"|5 || align="center"|– || 333 || 11,038 || 2,297 || 716 || 5,738 || 33.1 || 6.9 || 2.2 || 17.2 || align=center|
|-
|align="left"| || align="center"|G || align="left"|Georgia Tech || align="center"|1 || align="center"| || 21 || 159 || 11 || 32 || 25 || 7.6 || 0.5 || 1.5 || 1.2 || align=center|
|-
|align="left"| (#36) || align="center"|F/C || align="left"|Tennessee State || align="center"|7 || align="center"|– || 435 || 11,015 || 3,370 || 632 || 4,846 || 25.3 || 7.7 || 1.5 || 11.1 || align=center|
|-
|align="left"| || align="center"|G || align="left"|Weber State || align="center"|1 || align="center"| || 2 || 19 || 0 || 5 || 8 || 9.5 || 0.0 || 2.5 || 4.0 || align=center|
|-
|align="left"| || align="center"|C || align="left"|Jackson State || align="center"|3 || align="center"|– || 187 || 2,585 || 576 || 147 || 819 || 13.8 || 3.1 || 0.8 || 4.4 || align=center|
|-
|align="left"| || align="center"|F || align="left"|Alcorn State || align="center"|1 || align="center"| || 19 || 351 || 65 || 19 || 110 || 18.5 || 3.4 || 1.0 || 5.8 || align=center|
|-
|align="left" bgcolor="#CCFFCC"|x || align="center"|C || align="left"| Cedevita Junior || align="center"|5 || align="center"|– || 181 || 4,956 || 1,759 || 480 || 2,727 || 27.4 || 9.7 || 2.7 || 15.1 || align=center|
|-
|align="left"| || align="center"|F/C || align="left"| Atenas de Cordoba || align="center"|1 || align="center"| || 5 || 45 || 7 || 0 || 7 || 9.0 || 1.4 || 0.0 || 1.4 || align=center|
|-
|align="left"| || align="center"|C || align="left"|Ohio State || align="center"|2 || align="center"|– || 82 || 1,816 || 602 || 50 || 773 || 22.1 || 7.3 || 0.6 || 9.4 || align=center|
|-
|align="left"| || align="center"|F/C || align="left"|Eau Claire HS (SC) || align="center"|4 || align="center"|– || 211 || 2,436 || 651 || 56 || 817 || 11.5 || 3.1 || 0.3 || 3.9 || align=center|
|-
|align="left"| || align="center"|F || align="left"|Starkville HS (MS) || align="center"|7 || align="center"|– || 377 || 8,160 || 1,276 || 319 || 3,607 || 21.6 || 3.4 || 0.8 || 9.6 || align=center|
|-
|align="left"| || align="center"|F/C || align="left"|South Carolina || align="center"|4 || align="center"|– || 319 || 8,685 || 2,310 || 795 || 4,437 || 27.2 || 7.2 || 2.5 || 13.9 || align=center|
|-
|align="left"| || align="center"|G || align="left"|USC || align="center"|1 || align="center"| || 72 || 894 || 97 || 140 || 332 || 12.4 || 1.3 || 1.9 || 4.6 || align=center|
|-
|align="left"| || align="center"|C || align="left"| Panathinaikos || align="center"|1 || align="center"| || 1 || 4 || 1 || 0 || 2 || 4.0 || 1.0 || 0.0 || 2.0 || align=center|
|-
|align="left"| || align="center"|F || align="left"|Cincinnati || align="center"|5 || align="center"|– || 341 || 8,084 || 1,257 || 545 || 3,318 || 23.7 || 3.7 || 1.6 || 9.7 || align=center|
|-
|align="left"| || align="center"|G/F || align="left"| Budućnost || align="center"|1 || align="center"| || 39 || 528 || 56 || 32 || 103 || 13.5 || 1.4 || 0.8 || 2.6 || align=center|
|-
|align="left" bgcolor="#FFCC00"|+ || align="center"|G/F || align="left"|Dayton || align="center"|9 || align="center"|– || 627 || 18,398 || 1,415 || 2,007 || 10,003 || 29.3 || 2.3 || 3.2 || 16.0 || align=center|
|-
|align="left"| || align="center"|C || align="left"|Vanderbilt || align="center"|1 || align="center"| || 13 || 58 || 18 || 2 || 14 || 4.5 || 1.4 || 0.2 || 1.1 || align=center|
|-
|align="left"| || align="center"|G || align="left"|Auburn || align="center"|1 || align="center"| || 33 || 621 || 74 || 38 || 215 || 18.8 || 2.2 || 1.2 || 6.5 || align=center|
|-
|align="left" bgcolor="#FFCC00"|+ (#45) || align="center"|G || align="left"|Princeton || align="center"|6 || align="center"|– || 446 || 16,787 || 1,271 || 2,057 || 9,732 || 37.6 || 2.8 || 4.6 || 21.8 || align=center|
|-
|align="left" bgcolor="#FFFF99"|^ || align="center"|G || align="left"| Cibona || align="center"|2 || align="center"|– || 95 || 1,100 || 129 || 136 || 663 || 11.6 || 1.4 || 1.4 || 7.0 || align=center|
|-
|align="left"| || align="center"|C || align="left"|La Salle || align="center"|1 || align="center"| || 18 || 78 || 16 || 5 || 30 || 4.3 || 0.9 || 0.3 || 1.7 || align=center|
|-
|align="left" bgcolor="#FFFF99"|^ || align="center"|G/F || align="left"|Central Arkansas || align="center"|4 || align="center"|– || 272 || 8,789 || 1,445 || 1,348 || 3,091 || 32.3 || 5.3 || 5.0 || 11.4 || align=center|
|-
|align="left"| || align="center"|F/C || align="left"|Duke || align="center"|2 || align="center"|– || 136 || 3,600 || 1,060 || 440 || 1,346 || 26.5 || 7.8 || 3.2 || 9.9 || align=center|
|-
|align="left" bgcolor="#FFCC00"|+ (#30) || align="center"|G || align="left"|Wisconsin-Stevens Point || align="center"|10 || align="center"|– || 758 || 23,978 || 2,620 || bgcolor="#CFECEC"|5,319 || 11,330 || 31.6 || 3.5 || 7.0 || 14.9 || align=center|
|-
|align="left"| || align="center"|G || align="left"|Utah Valley || align="center"|1 || align="center"| || 39 || 510 || 44 || 73 || 105 || 13.1 || 1.1 || 1.9 || 2.7 || align=center|
|-
|align="left"| || align="center"|C || align="left"|Minnesota || align="center"|8 || align="center"|– || 422 || 9,300 || 3,010 || 210 || 1,968 || 22.0 || 7.1 || 0.5 || 4.7 || align=center|
|}

Q to R

|-
|align="left"| || align="center"|G || align="left"|LSU || align="center"|1 || align="center"| || 16 || 80 || 14 || 11 || 31 || 5.0 || 0.9 || 0.7 || 1.9 || align=center|
|-
|align="left"| || align="center"|F || align="left"|Duke || align="center"|2 || align="center"|– || 13 || 43 || 19 || 1 || 22 || 3.3 || 1.5 || 0.1 || 1.7 || align=center|
|-
|align="left"| || align="center"|F/C || align="left"|Michigan State || align="center"|6 || align="center"|– || 387 || 11,179 || 2,985 || 594 || 6,202 || 28.9 || 7.7 || 1.5 || 16.0 || align=center|
|-
|align="left"| || align="center"|G || align="left"|Ohio State || align="center"|2 || align="center"|– || 158 || 4,849 || 381 || 1,110 || 2,470 || 30.7 || 2.4 || 7.0 || 15.6 || align=center|
|-
|align="left"| || align="center"|F/C || align="left"|Wyoming || align="center"|3 || align="center"|– || 150 || 4,048 || 843 || 82 || 808 || 27.0 || 5.6 || 0.5 || 5.4 || align=center|
|-
|align="left"| || align="center"|G/F || align="left"|St. Mary's (TX) || align="center"|1 || align="center"| || 12 || 85 || 8 || 8 || 31 || 7.1 || 0.7 || 0.7 || 2.6 || align=center|
|-
|align="left"| || align="center"|G/F || align="left"|Delta State || align="center"|1 || align="center"| || 1 || 1 || 0 || 0 || 0 || 1.0 || 0.0 || 0.0 || 0.0 || align=center|
|-
|align="left"| || align="center"|G || align="left"|UNLV || align="center"|3 || align="center"|– || 197 || 6,734 || 846 || 533 || 3,332 || 34.2 || 4.3 || 2.7 || 16.9 || align=center|
|-
|align="left"| || align="center"|F/C || align="left"|Cincinnati || align="center"|1 || align="center"| || 69 || 2,060 || 701 || 133 || 933 || 29.9 || 10.2 || 1.9 || 13.5 || align=center|
|-
|align="left"| || align="center"|G || align="left"|Dayton || align="center"|1 || align="center"| || 21 || 137 || 12 || 16 || 60 || 6.5 || 0.6 || 0.8 || 2.9 || align=center|
|-
|align="left" bgcolor="#FFCC00"|+ || align="center"|F/C || align="left"|UConn || align="center"|8 || align="center"|– || 644 || 19,839 || 3,352 || 1,350 || 10,405 || 30.8 || 5.2 || 2.1 || 16.2 || align=center|
|-
|align="left"| || align="center"|G || align="left"|Alabama || align="center"|3 || align="center"|– || 205 || 3,839 || 367 || 398 || 1,576 || 18.7 || 1.8 || 1.9 || 7.7 || align=center|
|-
|align="left"| || align="center"|G || align="left"|Michigan || align="center"|2 || align="center"|– || 70 || 1,010 || 108 || 194 || 342 || 14.4 || 1.5 || 2.8 || 4.9 || align=center|
|-
|align="left"| || align="center"|F || align="left"|Kansas || align="center"|2 || align="center"|– || 102 || 1,264 || 440 || 43 || 454 || 12.4 || 4.3 || 0.4 || 4.5 || align=center|
|-
|align="left"| || align="center"|G || align="left"| Estudiantes || align="center"|3 || align="center"|– || 219 || 2,715 || 279 || 627 || 783 || 12.4 || 1.3 || 2.9 || 3.6 || align=center|
|-
|align="left"| || align="center"|F/C || align="left"|Tennessee State || align="center"|2 || align="center"|– || 5 || 33 || 3 || 3 || 9 || 6.6 || 0.6 || 0.6 || 1.8 || align=center|
|-
|align="left"| || align="center"|G || align="left"|St. John's || align="center"|1 || align="center"| || 7 || 16 || 1 || 1 || 12 || 2.3 || 0.1 || 0.1 || 1.7 || align=center|
|-
|align="left" bgcolor="#FFCC00"|+ || align="center"|G || align="left"|Washington || align="center"|5 || align="center"|– || 321 || 11,439 || 1,374 || 1,494 || 6,107 || 35.6 || 4.3 || 4.7 || 19.0 || align=center|
|-
|align="left"| || align="center"|G || align="left"|Wake Forest || align="center"|1 || align="center"| || 15 || 95 || 9 || 17 || 26 || 6.3 || 0.6 || 1.1 || 1.7 || align=center|
|-
|align="left"| || align="center"|F || align="left"|Tulsa || align="center"|1 || align="center"| || 11 || 35 || 11 || 0 || 6 || 3.2 || 1.0 || 0.0 || 0.5 || align=center|
|}

S

|-
|align="left" bgcolor="#FFFF99"|^ || align="center"|C || align="left"| BC Žalgiris || align="center"|7 || align="center"|– || 470 || 11,375 || 3,436 || 964 || 5,629 || 24.2 || 7.3 || 2.1 || 12.0 || align=center|
|-
|align="left"| || align="center"|C || align="left"|Purdue || align="center"|1 || align="center"| || 39 || 268 || 76 || 11 || 52 || 6.9 || 1.9 || 0.3 || 1.3 || align=center|
|-
|align="left"| || align="center"|C || align="left"|Georgia Tech || align="center"|1 || align="center"| || 11 || 118 || 25 || 1 || 19 || 10.7 || 2.3 || 0.1 || 1.7 || align=center|
|-
|align="left"| || align="center"|C || align="left"|Colorado State || align="center"|3 || align="center"|– || 171 || 4,625 || 1,510 || 495 || 1,629 || 27.0 || 8.8 || 2.9 || 9.5 || align=center|
|-
|align="left"| || align="center"|F/C || align="left"|Washington || align="center"|2 || align="center"|– || 103 || 2,059 || 410 || 241 || 678 || 20.0 || 4.0 || 2.3 || 6.6 || align=center|
|-
|align="left"| || align="center"|G || align="left"|UC Santa Barbara || align="center"|1 || align="center"| || 1 || 5 || 1 || 1 || 0 || 5.0 || 1.0 || 1.0 || 0.0 || align=center|
|-
|align="left"| || align="center"|G || align="left"|Northwestern || align="center"|1 || align="center"| || 28 || 124 || 25 || 13 || 46 || 4.4 || 0.9 || 0.5 || 1.6 || align=center|
|-
|align="left"| || align="center"|G || align="left"|Purdue || align="center"|2 || align="center"|– || 53 || 714 || 44 || 92 || 217 || 13.5 || 0.8 || 1.7 || 4.1 || align=center|
|-
|align="left" bgcolor="#CCFFCC"|x || align="center"|G || align="left"|IMG Academy (FL) || align="center"|3 || align="center"|– || 91 || 1,600 || 166 || 110 || 661 || 17.6 || 1.8 || 1.2 || 7.3 || align=center|
|-
|align="left"| || align="center"|F || align="left"|Baylor || align="center"|1 || align="center"| || 27 || 515 || 127 || 13 || 103 || 19.1 || 4.7 || 0.5 || 3.8 || align=center|
|-
|align="left"| || align="center"|F || align="left"|Wyoming || align="center"|1 || align="center"| || 4 || 20 || 3 || 0 || 6 || 5.0 || 0.8 || 0.0 || 1.5 || align=center|
|-
|align="left"| || align="center"|G || align="left"|New Mexico || align="center"|2 || align="center"| || 24 || 221 || 16 || 10 || 85 || 9.2 || 0.7 || 0.4 || 3.5 || align=center|
|-
|align="left"| || align="center"|F || align="left"|Boston College || align="center"|1 || align="center"| || 47 || 464 || 110 || 19 || 156 || 9.9 || 2.3 || 0.4 || 3.3 || align=center|
|-
|align="left"| || align="center"|F || align="left"|Western Kentucky || align="center"|4 || align="center"|– || 195 || 2,969 || 653 || 222 || 953 || 15.2 || 3.3 || 1.1 || 4.9 || align=center|
|-
|align="left"| || align="center"|G || align="left"|Duke || align="center"|2 || align="center"|– || 84 || 829 || 83 || 97 || 277 || 9.9 || 1.0 || 1.2 || 3.3 || align=center|
|-
|align="left"| || align="center"|C || align="left"|TCU || align="center"|2 || align="center"|– || 66 || 384 || 120 || 5 || 99 || 5.8 || 1.8 || 0.1 || 1.5 || align=center|
|-
|align="left"| || align="center"|G || align="left"|Michigan State || align="center"|2 || align="center"|– || 163 || 5,231 || 585 || 422 || 2,330 || 32.1 || 3.6 || 2.6 || 14.3 || align=center|
|-
|align="left"| || align="center"|C || align="left"|Syracuse || align="center"|2 || align="center"|– || 30 || 491 || 143 || 20 || 205 || 16.4 || 4.8 || 0.7 || 6.8 || align=center|
|-
|align="left"| || align="center"|G || align="left"|Missouri || align="center"|1 || align="center"| || 13 || 131 || 13 || 17 || 58 || 10.1 || 1.0 || 1.3 || 4.5 || align=center|
|-
|align="left"| || align="center"|C || align="left"|UNLV || align="center"|1 || align="center"| || 11 || 37 || 9 || 1 || 14 || 3.4 || 0.8 || 0.1 || 1.3 || align=center|
|-
|align="left"| || align="center"|G || align="left"|Michigan || align="center"|1 || align="center"| || 44 || 673 || 80 || 62 || 267 || 15.3 || 1.8 || 1.4 || 6.1 || align=center|
|-
|align="left"| (#15) || align="center"|G/F || align="left"|Kentucky || align="center"|9 || align="center"|– || 610 || 14,777 || 1,781 || 1,719 || 5,009 || 24.2 || 2.9 || 2.8 || 8.2 || align=center|
|-
|align="left"| || align="center"|C || align="left"| Olimpija || align="center"|1 || align="center"| || 42 || 453 || 125 || 23 || 108 || 10.8 || 3.0 || 0.5 || 2.6 || align=center|
|-
|align="left"| || align="center"|G/F || align="left"|Georgia Tech || align="center"|1 || align="center"| || 27 || 244 || 32 || 16 || 103 || 9.0 || 1.2 || 0.6 || 3.8 || align=center|
|-
|align="left"| || align="center"|G || align="left"|Arizona || align="center"|8 || align="center"|– || 529 || 17,497 || 1,859 || 3,018 || 6,745 || 33.1 || 3.5 || 5.7 || 12.8 || align=center|
|-
|align="left"| || align="center"|F || align="left"|Pacific || align="center"|1 || align="center"| || 1 || 2 || 0 || 0 || 4 || 2.0 || 0.0 || 0.0 || 4.0 || align=center|
|-
|align="left"| || align="center"|G || align="left"|DePaul || align="center"|5 || align="center"|– || 312 || 10,507 || 1,356 || 2,573 || 5,044 || 33.7 || 4.3 || bgcolor="#CFECEC"|8.2 || 16.2 || align=center|
|-
|align="left"| || align="center"|G || align="left"|Christopher Newport || align="center"|1 || align="center"| || 4 || 17 || 1 || 1 || 10 || 4.3 || 0.3 || 0.3 || 2.5 || align=center|
|-
|align="left"| || align="center"|F || align="left"|Purdue || align="center"|3 || align="center"|– || 65 || 599 || 199 || 50 || 156 || 9.2 || 3.1 || 0.8 || 2.4 || align=center|
|}

T to V

|-
|align="left"| || align="center"|G || align="left"|Abraham Lincoln HS (NY) || align="center"|2 || align="center"|– || 136 || 2,971 || 224 || 471 || 1,103 || 21.8 || 1.6 || 3.5 || 8.1 || align=center|
|-
|align="left"| || align="center"|F/C || align="left"|SMU || align="center"|1 || align="center"| || 18 || 160 || 37 || 15 || 68 || 8.9 || 2.1 || 0.8 || 3.8 || align=center|
|-
|align="left"| || align="center"|C || align="left"|UConn || align="center"|1 || align="center"| || 15 || 116 || 35 || 0 || 29 || 7.7 || 2.3 || 0.0 || 1.9 || align=center|
|-
|align="left"| || align="center"|F || align="left"|Texas || align="center"|1 || align="center"| || 9 || 112 || 35 || 4 || 24 || 12.4 || 3.9 || 0.4 || 2.7 || align=center|
|-
|align="left"| || align="center"|F || align="left"|TCU || align="center"|1 || align="center"| || 53 || 803 || 188 || 46 || 160 || 15.2 || 3.5 || 0.9 || 3.0 || align=center|
|-
|align="left"| || align="center"|G/F || align="left"|Fresno State || align="center"|1 || align="center"| || 59 || 535 || 76 || 52 || 197 || 9.1 || 1.3 || 0.9 || 3.3 || align=center|
|-
|align="left"| || align="center"|F/C || align="left"|NC State || align="center"|1 || align="center"| || 14 || 58 || 13 || 3 || 13 || 4.1 || 0.9 || 0.2 || 0.9 || align=center|
|-
|align="left"| || align="center"|F/C || align="left"|Minnesota || align="center"|7 || align="center"|– || 551 || 18,913 || 4,878 || 1,848 || 9,215 || 34.3 || 8.9 || 3.4 || 16.7 || align=center|
|-
|align="left"| || align="center"|F/C || align="left"|Providence || align="center"|1 || align="center"| || 34 || 908 || 236 || 54 || 458 || 26.7 || 6.9 || 1.6 || 13.5 || align=center|
|-
|align="left"| || align="center"|F/C || align="left"|Creighton || align="center"|2 || align="center"| || 35 || 558 || 111 || 29 || 129 || 15.9 || 3.2 || 0.8 || 3.7 || align=center|
|-
|align="left"| || align="center"|G/F || align="left"|James Madison || align="center"|1 || align="center"| || 55 || 516 || 65 || 31 || 247 || 9.4 || 1.2 || 0.6 || 4.5 || align=center|
|-
|align="left"| || align="center"|F || align="left"|Ohio || align="center"|3 || align="center"|– || 192 || 4,142 || 900 || 195 || 1,871 || 21.6 || 4.7 || 1.0 || 9.7 || align=center|
|-
|align="left" bgcolor="#CCFFCC"|x || align="center"|G || align="left"|Duke || align="center"|3 || align="center"|– || 78 || 1,475 || 114 || 69 || 592 || 18.9 || 1.5 || 0.9 || 7.6 || align=center|
|-
|align="left"| || align="center"|F || align="left"|Akron || align="center"|1 || align="center"| || 2 || 8 || 2 || 0 || 4 || 4.0 || 1.0 || 0.0 || 2.0 || align=center|
|-
|align="left"| || align="center"|G || align="left"|Ohio State || align="center"|3 || align="center"|– || 217 || 5,297 || 819 || 661 || 1,729 || 24.4 || 3.8 || 3.0 || 8.0 || align=center|
|-
|align="left"| (#13) || align="center"|G || align="left"|Old Dominion || align="center"|4 || align="center"|– || 280 || 6,921 || 611 || 940 || 2,666 || 24.7 || 2.2 || 3.4 || 9.5 || align=center|
|-
|align="left"| || align="center"|F || align="left"|Portland State || align="center"|1 || align="center"| || 75 || 2,144 || 279 || 112 || 629 || 28.6 || 3.7 || 1.5 || 8.4 || align=center|
|-
|align="left"| || align="center"|G || align="left"|Kansas || align="center"|5 || align="center"|– || 300 || 7,590 || 684 || 1,619 || 2,937 || 25.3 || 2.3 || 5.4 || 9.8 || align=center|
|-
|align="left"| || align="center"|G || align="left"|Cincinnati || align="center"|1 || align="center"| || 53 || 1,619 || 161 || 227 || 586 || 30.5 || 3.0 || 4.3 || 11.1 || align=center|
|-
|align="left"| || align="center"|F || align="left"|UCLA || align="center"|5 || align="center"|– || 285 || 9,792 || 839 || 618 || 6,698 || 34.4 || 2.9 || 2.2 || bgcolor="#CFECEC"|23.5 || align=center|
|-
|align="left"| || align="center"|G || align="left"|Duke || align="center"|1 || align="center"| || 21 || 216 || 18 || 17 || 104 || 10.3 || 0.9 || 0.8 || 5.0 || align=center|
|-
|align="left"| || align="center"|F || align="left"|Fresno State || align="center"|3 || align="center"|– || 162 || 2,061 || 411 || 104 || 661 || 12.7 || 2.5 || 0.6 || 4.1 || align=center|
|-
|align="left"| || align="center"|F || align="left"|Indiana || align="center"|3 || align="center"|– || 185 || 2,915 || 859 || 74 || 729 || 15.8 || 4.6 || 0.4 || 3.9 || align=center|
|-
|align="left"| || align="center"|C || align="left"| Budućnost || align="center"|1 || align="center"| || 1 || 3 || 0 || 0 || 0 || 3.0 || 0.0 || 0.0 || 0.0 || align=center|
|}

W to Y

|-
|align="left"| || align="center"|G || align="left"|Florida State || align="center"|1 || align="center"| || 8 || 64 || 9 || 2 || 19 || 8.0 || 1.1 || 0.3 || 2.4 || align=center|
|-
|align="left"| || align="center"|F || align="left"|Virginia || align="center"|2 || align="center"|– || 75 || 728 || 125 || 59 || 384 || 9.7 || 1.7 || 0.8 || 5.1 || align=center|
|-
|align="left"| || align="center"|F || align="left"|Alabama || align="center"|2 || align="center"|– || 65 || 2,324 || 452 || 172 || 921 || 35.8 || 7.0 || 2.6 || 14.2 || align=center|
|-
|align="left" bgcolor="#FFCC00"|+ || align="center"|F/C || align="left"|North Carolina || align="center"|8 || align="center"|– || 544 || 19,309 || 3,797 || 1,102 || 9,119 || 35.5 || 7.0 || 2.0 || 16.8 || align=center|
|-
|align="left" bgcolor="#FFFF99"|^ (#32) || align="center"|F/C || align="left"|UCLA || align="center"|4 || align="center"|– || 209 || 7,033 || 2,822 || 923 || 3,578 || 33.7 || bgcolor="#CFECEC"|13.5 || 4.4 || 17.1 || align=center|
|-
|align="left" bgcolor="#FFCC00"|+ || align="center"|F/C || align="left"|American || align="center"|3 || align="center"|– || 173 || 5,195 || 1,645 || 345 || 2,004 || 30.0 || 9.5 || 2.0 || 11.6 || align=center|
|-
|align="left"| || align="center"|G || align="left"|UCLA || align="center"|1 || align="center"| || 24 || 161 || 15 || 28 || 12 || 6.7 || 0.6 || 1.2 || 0.5 || align=center|
|-
|align="left"| || align="center"|G/F || align="left"|Seattle Prep. (WA) || align="center"|5 || align="center"|– || 301 || 6,971 || 934 || 238 || 2,545 || 23.2 || 3.1 || 0.8 || 8.5 || align=center|
|-
|align="left"| || align="center"|G/F || align="left"|Ball State || align="center"|6 || align="center"|– || 310 || 8,340 || 1,457 || 793 || 4,112 || 26.9 || 4.7 || 2.6 || 13.3 || align=center|
|-
|align="left"| || align="center"|G || align="left"|Alabama || align="center"|2 || align="center"| || 26 || 231 || 24 || 37 || 73 || 8.9 || 0.9 || 1.4 || 2.8 || align=center|
|-
|align="left"| || align="center"|G || align="left"|William Paterson || align="center"|1 || align="center"| || 20 || 211 || 19 || 33 || 49 || 10.6 || 1.0 || 1.7 || 2.5 || align=center|
|-
|align="left"| || align="center"|C || align="left"|Marshall || align="center"|1 || align="center"| || 67 || 2,008 || 905 || 78 || 1,040 || 30.0 || 13.5 || 1.2 || 15.5 || align=center|
|-
|align="left" bgcolor="#FFCC00"|+ || align="center"|F/C || align="left"|UCLA || align="center"|5 || align="center"|– || 398 || 15,456 || 4,086 || 1,647 || 8,882 || bgcolor="#CFECEC"|38.8 || 10.3 || 4.1 || 22.3 || align=center|
|-
|align="left" bgcolor="#FFFF99"|^ || align="center"|G || align="left"|Providence || align="center"|1 || align="center"| || 65 || 1,161 || 120 || 235 || 420 || 17.9 || 1.8 || 3.6 || 6.5 || align=center|
|-
|align="left"| || align="center"|G || align="left"|Villanova || align="center"|1 || align="center"| || 41 || 864 || 60 || 83 || 283 || 21.1 || 1.5 || 2.0 || 6.9 || align=center|
|-
|align="left"| || align="center"|F/C || align="left"|Maryland || align="center"|7 || align="center"|– || 557 || 17,130 || 4,861 || 596 || 5,677 || 30.8 || 8.7 || 1.1 || 10.2 || align=center|
|-
|align="left"| || align="center"|G || align="left"|Memphis || align="center"|1 || align="center"| || 24 || 149 || 19 || 6 || 88 || 6.2 || 0.8 || 0.3 || 3.7 || align=center|
|-
|align="left"| || align="center"|G || align="left"|Alabama || align="center"|1 || align="center"| || 74 || 1,834 || 153 || 321 || 721 || 24.8 || 2.1 || 4.3 || 9.7 || align=center|
|-
|align="left"| || align="center"|G/F || align="left"|Maryland || align="center"|2 || align="center"|– || 79 || 1,638 || 225 || 133 || 706 || 20.7 || 2.8 || 1.7 || 8.9 || align=center|
|-
|align="left"| || align="center"|F || align="left"|LSU || align="center"|1 || align="center"| || 15 || 54 || 11 || 3 || 19 || 3.6 || 0.7 || 0.2 || 1.3 || align=center|
|-
|align="left"| || align="center"|F || align="left"|Cincinnati || align="center"|3 || align="center"|– || 94 || 1,065 || 245 || 73 || 377 || 11.3 || 2.6 || 0.8 || 4.0 || align=center|
|-
|align="left"| || align="center"|G || align="left"|Penn || align="center"|1 || align="center"| || 22 || 393 || 20 || 68 || 118 || 17.9 || 0.9 || 3.1 || 5.4 || align=center|
|-
|align="left"| || align="center"|F/C || align="left"|North Carolina || align="center"|1 || align="center"| || 21 || 156 || 45 || 5 || 52 || 7.4 || 2.1 || 0.2 || 2.5 || align=center|
|-
|align="left"| || align="center"|F || align="left"|Northeast Mississippi CC || align="center"|2 || align="center"|– || 115 || 1,007 || 189 || 58 || 352 || 8.8 || 1.6 || 0.5 || 3.1 || align=center|
|-
|align="left"| || align="center"|G/F || align="left"|South Kent School (CT) || align="center"|2 || align="center"|– || 116 || 1,576 || 302 || 105 || 562 || 13.6 || 2.6 || 0.9 || 4.8 || align=center|
|-
|align="left"| || align="center"|G/F || align="left"|Fordham || align="center"|1 || align="center"| || 69 || 1,227 || 201 || 81 || 545 || 17.8 || 2.9 || 1.2 || 7.9 || align=center|
|-
|align="left"| || align="center"|G || align="left"|Wake Forest || align="center"|4 || align="center"|– || 223 || 3,376 || 280 || 515 || 1,008 || 15.1 || 1.3 || 2.3 || 4.5 || align=center|
|-
|align="left"| || align="center"|G || align="left"|Virginia Tech || align="center"|1 || align="center"| || 4 || 52 || 7 || 7 || 8 || 13.0 || 1.8 || 1.8 || 2.0 || align=center|
|}

Single Game Leaders

Source: https://stathead.com/tiny/Y159F

Source: https://stathead.com/tiny/ooOac

Source: https://stathead.com/tiny/JzumP

References

External links
 Portland Trail Blazers all-time rosters
 Past Blazers Rosters

National Basketball Association all-time rosters
Portland Trail Blazers players
roster